Onaral is a surname. Notable people with the surname include:

 Banu Onaral, Professor of Biomedical Engineering and Electrical Engineering at Drexel University
 Mutlu Onaral (born 1979), American musician

Turkish-language surnames